This is a list of Belgian television related events from 1993.

Events
8 March - Barbara Dex is selected to represent Belgium at the 1993 Eurovision Song Contest with her song "Iemand als jij". She is selected to be the thirty-eighth Belgian Eurovision entry during Eurosong held at the Knokke Casino in Knokke.
Unknown - Wim Dekoker, performing as John Denver wins the fifth season of VTM Soundmixshow.

Debuts

Domestic
31 August - Wittekerke (1993-2008)

New International Programming
 Noddy's Toyland Adventures

Television shows

1980s
VTM Soundmixshow (1989-1995, 1997-2000)

1990s
Samson en Gert (1990–present)
Familie (1991–present)

Ending this year

Births

Deaths